Andrew Radchenko (born 3 May 1955) is a former Australian rules footballer who played for the Essendon Football Club in the Victorian Football League (VFL). He later played for Avondale Heights, Ascot Vale and Brunswick.

Football career

In 1976/77 he played for Avondale Heights. From 1978 to 1980 — for Ascot Vale. In 1981/1982 Andrew joined Brunswick.

Notes

External links 
		

Living people
1955 births
Australian rules footballers from Victoria (Australia)
Essendon Football Club players
Brunswick Football Club players